This is a list of Category A listed buildings in East Dunbartonshire, Scotland.

In Scotland, the term listed building refers to a building or other structure officially designated as being of "special architectural or historic interest". Category A structures are those considered to be "buildings of national or international importance, either architectural or historic, or fine little-altered examples of some particular period, style or building type." Listing was begun by a provision in the Town and Country Planning (Scotland) Act 1947, and the current legislative basis for listing is the Planning (Listed Buildings and Conservation Areas) (Scotland) Act 1997. The authority for listing rests with Historic Scotland, an executive agency of the Scottish Government, which inherited this role from the Scottish Development Department in 1991. Once listed, severe restrictions are imposed on the modifications allowed to a building's structure or its fittings. Listed building consent must be obtained from local authorities prior to any alteration to such a structure. There are approximately 47,400 listed buildings in Scotland, of which around 8% (some 3,800) are Category A.

There are 15 Category A listed buildings in the area. These include several works by the Glasgow-based architect David Hamilton, including the now-derelict Lennox Castle, and two late villas by Alexander Thomson. There are several Category A listed churches and country houses, with the oldest being Bardowie Castle, which dates partly to the 16th century.

Listed buildings 

|}

Notes

References

External links

East Dunbartonshire
Category A listed buildings in East Dunbartonshire